USS Putnam may refer to the following ships of the United States Navy:

 , was a Clemson-class destroyer, commissioned in 1919 and decommissioned in 1929
 , is a Fletcher-class destroyer, renamed and commissioned in 1943 as The Sullivans
 , was an Allen M. Sumner-class destroyer, commissioned in 1944 and struck in 1973

See also
 , a gunship that served during the Civil War (1861–65).

United States Navy ship names